André Alba (1894–1979), a graduate from the École Normale Supérieure and agrégé in history, was a professor of history in khâgne at lycée Henri-IV until 1959. He was one of the masters who formed generations of historians in France after the Second World War. He was the author of numerous textbooks

Textbooks 
 Le Moyen Âge (classe de 5e), (Hachette)	
 Histoire romaine (classe de 5e), with Jules Isaac and Albert Malet	 (Hachette)	
 Le Moyen Âge (classe de 5e), (Hachette)	
 Rome et le Moyen Âge jusqu'en 1328 (classe de 5e), (Hachette)
 Rome et les débuts du Moyen Âge (classe de 5e), (Hachette)
 Histoire contemporaine depuis le milieu du XIXe. Supplément 1919-1939 with Jules Isaac, (Hachette)	
 Histoire contemporaine, de 1852 à 1939 (classes de philosophie, de mathématiques élémentaires)  with Antoine Bonifacio and Jules Isaac, (Hachette)	
 De 1848 à 1914 (classe de 1re, with Antoine Bonifacio, Jules Isaac and Jean Michaud (Hachette)	
 L'Époque révolutionnaire de 1789 à 1851 (classe de 1re) with Jules Isaac and Charles-Hippolyte Pouthas, (Hachette)	
 Les Temps modernes (classe de 4e)	(Hachette)	
 Histoire, de 987 à 1789 (classe de 4e moderne), (Hachette)	
 La Fin du Moyen Âge, le XVIe et le XVIIe, à l'usage de la classe de 4e, (Hachette)	
 Le Moyen Âge jusqu’à la guerre de Cent Ans with Jules Isaac and Albert Malet, (Hachette)		
 De la Révolution de 1789 à la révolution de 1848 (classe de 2e), with Jules Isaac, Jean Michaud and Charles Hippolyte Pouthas (Hachette)
 L'Orient et la Grèce (classe de 6e) with Gaston Dez (Hachette)
 Histoire contemporaine (Classe de 3e). Troisième année des écoles primaires supérieures. (Hachette)

External links 
 André Alba in Génération intellectuelle: Khâgneux et Normaliens dans l'entre-deux-guerres
 Alba, André on idref

20th-century French historians
École Normale Supérieure alumni
1894 births
1979 deaths
Lycée Henri-IV teachers